The Razzie Award for Worst Screenplay is an award presented at the annual Golden Raspberry Awards for the worst film screenplay of the past year. The following is a list of nominees and recipients of that award, including each screenplay's author(s).

1980s
1980 Can't Stop the Music, written by Bronte Woodard and Allan Carr
 A Change of Seasons, written by Erich Segal, Ronni Kern and Fred Segal
 Cruising, written by William Friedkin
 The Formula, written by Steve Shagan
 It's My Turn, written by Eleanor Bergstein
 Middle Age Crazy, written by Carl Kleinschmidt
 Raise the Titanic, written by Adam Kennedy and Eric Hughes
 Touched by Love, written by Hesper Anderson
 Windows, written by Barry Siegel
 Xanadu, written by Richard C. Danus and Marc C. Rubel
1981 Mommie Dearest, screenplay by Frank Yablans, Frank Perry, Tracy Hotchner and Robert Getchell, based on the book by Christina Crawford
 Endless Love, screenplay by Judith Rascoe, based on the novel by Scott Spencer
 Heaven's Gate, written by Michael Cimino
 S.O.B., written by Blake Edwards
 Tarzan, the Ape Man, screenplay by Tom Rowe and Gary Goddard, based on characters created by Edgar Rice Burroughs
1982 Inchon, written by Robin Moore and Laird Koenig
 Annie, screenplay by Carol Sobieski, based on the play by Thomas Meehan, based on the comic strip Little Orphan Annie created by Harold Gray (uncredited)
 Butterfly, screenplay by John Goff and Matt Cimber, adaptation by Matt Cimber, based on the novel by James M. Cain
 The Pirate Movie, written by Trevor Farrant, "ripped off from" Gilbert and Sullivan's operetta The Pirates of Penzance
 Yes, Giorgio, screenplay by Norman Steinberg, "suggested" by the novel by Annie Piper
1983 The Lonely Lady, screenplay by John Kershaw and Shawn Randall, adaptation by Ellen Shephard, from the novel by Harold Robbins
 Flashdance, screenplay by Tom Hedley and Joe Eszterhas, story by Tom Hedley
 Hercules, screenplay by Luigi Cozzi
 Jaws 3-D, screenplay by Richard Matheson and Carl Gottlieb, story by Guerdon Trueblood, "suggested" by the Peter Benchley novel Jaws
 Two of a Kind, written by John Herzfeld
1984 Bolero, written by John Derek
 Cannonball Run II, screenplay by Harvey Miller, Hal Needham and Albert S. Ruddy
 Rhinestone, screenplay by Phil Alden Robinson and Sylvester Stallone, story by Phil Alden Robinson
 Sheena, screenplay by David Newman and Lorenzo Semple, Jr., story by David Newman and Leslie Stevens, based on the comic by S.M. Eiger and Will Eisner (uncredited)
 Where the Boys Are '84, screenplay by Stu Krieger and Jeff Burkhart, "suggested" by the novel by Glendon Swarthout
1985  Rambo: First Blood Part II, screenplay by Sylvester Stallone and James Cameron, story by Kevin Jarre, based on characters created by David Morrell
 Fever Pitch, written by Richard Brooks
 Perfect, screenplay by Aaron Latham and James Bridges, based on articles in Rolling Stone magazine by Aaron Latham
 Rocky IV, written by Sylvester Stallone
 Year of the Dragon, screenplay by Oliver Stone and Michael Cimino, based on the novel by Robert Daley
1986 Howard the Duck, written by Willard Huyck and Gloria Katz, based on the Marvel Comics character created by Steve Gerber
 9½ Weeks, screenplay by Patricia Louisianna Knop & Zalman King and Sarah Kernochan, based on the novel by Elizabeth McNeill
 Cobra, screenplay by Sylvester Stallone, based on the novel Fair Game by Paula Gosling
 Shanghai Surprise, screenplay by John Kohn and Robert Bentley, based on the novel Faraday's Flowers by Tony Kenrick
 Under the Cherry Moon, screenplay by Becky Johnston
1987 Leonard Part 6, screenplay by Jonathan Reynolds, story by Bill Cosby
 Ishtar, written by Elaine May
 Jaws: The Revenge, screenplay by Michael deGuzma, based on characters created by Peter Benchley
 Tough Guys Don't Dance, screenplay by Norman Mailer, based on his novel
 Who's That Girl, screenplay by Andrew Smith and Ken Finkleman, story by Andrew Smith
1988 Cocktail, screenplay by Heywood Gould, based on his book
 Hot to Trot, screenplay by Steven Neigher, Hugo Gilbert and Charlie Peters, story by Steven Neigher and Hugo Gilbert
 Mac and Me, written by Stewart Raffill and Steve Feke
 Rambo III, written by Sylvester Stallone and Sheldon Lettich, based on characters created by David Morrell
 Willow, screenplay by Bob Dolman, story by George Lucas
1989 Harlem Nights, written by Eddie Murphy
 The Karate Kid Part III, screenplay by Robert Mark Kamen, based on characters created by Robert Mark Kamen
 Road House, screenplay by David Lee Henry and Hilary Henkin, story by David Lee Henry
 Star Trek V: The Final Frontier, screenplay by David Loughery, story by William Shatner & Harve Bennett & David Loughery, based on the television series created by Gene Roddenberry
 Tango & Cash, written by Randy Feldman

1990s
1990 The Adventures of Ford Fairlane, screenplay by Daniel Waters, James Cappe & David Arnott, based on characters created by Rex Weiner
 The Bonfire of the Vanities, screenplay by Michael Cristofer, based on the novel by Tom Wolfe
 Ghosts Can't Do It, written by John Derek
 Graffiti Bridge, written by Prince
 Rocky V, written by Sylvester Stallone
1991 Hudson Hawk, screenplay by Steven E. de Souza and Daniel Waters, story by Bruce Willis and Robert Kraft
 Cool as Ice, written by David Stenn
 Dice Rules, concert material written by Andrew Dice Clay; "A Day in the Life" written by Lenny Schulman, story by Clay
 Nothing but Trouble, screenplay by Dan Aykroyd, story by Peter Aykroyd
 Return to the Blue Lagoon, screenplay by Leslie Stevens, based on the novel "The Garden of God" by Henry De Vere Stacpoole
1992 Stop! Or My Mom Will Shoot, written by Blake Snyder, William Osborne & William Davies
 The Bodyguard, written by Lawrence Kasdan
 Christopher Columbus: The Discovery, screenplay by John Briley and Cary Bates and Mario Puzo
 Final Analysis, screenplay by Wesley Strick, story by Robert H. Berger, M.D. (consultant), and Wesley Strick
 Shining Through, written for the screen by David Seltzer, based on the novel by Susan Isaacs
1993 Indecent Proposal, screenplay by Amy Holden Jones, based upon the novel by Jack Engelhard
 Body of Evidence, written by Brad Mirman (listed as "not based on the novel by Patricia Cornwell")
 Cliffhanger, screenplay by Michael France and Sylvester Stallone, screen story by France, based on a premise by John Long
 Last Action Hero, screenplay by Shane Black & David Arnott, story by Zak Penn & Adam Leff
 Sliver, screenplay by Joe Eszterhas, based on the novel by Ira Levin
1994 The Flintstones, screenplay by Tom S. Parker, Jim Jennewein, Steven E. de Souza, Al Aidekman, Kate Barker, Cindy Begel, Ruth Bennett, Bruce Cohen, Robert Conte, Rob Dames, Lon Diamond, Michael J. Di Gaetano, Fred Fox Jr., Lloyd Garver, Daniel Goldin, Joshua Goldin, Richard Gurman, Jason Hoffs, Brian Levant, Babaloo Mandel, Mitch Markowitz, Ron Osborn, Jeff Reno, David Richardson, Leonard Ripps, Gary Ross, Dava Savel, David Silverman, Nancy Steen, Stephen Sustarsic, Roy Teicher, Neil Thompson, Michael Wilson, and Peter Martin Wortmann, based on the television series created by William Hanna and Joseph Barbera (Steven E. de Souza and the team of Tom S. Parker & Jim Jennewein were the only "winners" credited in the film; the other 29 recipients all wrote drafts of the screenplay.)
 Color of Night, screenplay by Matthew Chapman and Billy Ray, story by Ray
 Milk Money, written by John Mattson
 North, screenplay by Alan Zweibel and Andrew Sheinman, from the novel by Zweibel
 On Deadly Ground, written by Ed Horowitz & Rubin Russin
1995 Showgirls, written by Joe Eszterhas
Congo, screenplay by John Patrick Shanley, based on the novel by Michael Crichton
It's Pat, written by Jim Emerson & Stephen Hibbert & Julia Sweeney, based on characters created by Sweeney
Jade, written by Joe Eszterhas
The Scarlet Letter, screenplay by Douglas Day Stewart, freely adapted from the novel by Nathaniel Hawthorne
1996 Striptease, screenplay by Andrew Bergman, based on the book by Carl Hiaasen
 Barb Wire, screenplay by Chuck Pfarrer and Ilene Chaiken, story by Chaiken, based upon the characters appearing in the Dark Horse comic
 Ed, screenplay by David Mickey Evans, story by Ken Richards and Janus Cercone
 The Island of Dr. Moreau, screenplay by Richard Stanley and Ron Hutchinson, based on the novel by H. G. Wells
 The Stupids, screenplay by Brent Forrester, based on a series of books by James Marshall and Harry Allard
1997 The Postman, screenplay by Eric Roth and Brian Helgeland, based on the book by David Brin
 Anaconda, written by Hans Bauer and Jim Cash & Jack Epps, Jr.
 Batman & Robin, screenplay by Akiva Goldsman, based on the DC Comics characters created by Bob Kane
 The Lost World: Jurassic Park, screenplay by David Koepp, based on the novel by Michael Crichton
 Speed 2: Cruise Control, screenplay by Randall McCormick and Jeff Nathanson, story by Jan de Bont and McCormick, based on characters created by Graham Yost
1998 An Alan Smithee Film: Burn Hollywood Burn, written by Joe Eszterhas
 Armageddon, screenplay by Jonathan Hensleigh and J. J. Abrams, story by Robert Roy Pool and Jonathan Hensleigh, adaptation by Tony Gilroy and Shane Salerno
 The Avengers, screenplay by Don MacPherson, based on the television series created by Sydney Newman
 Godzilla, screenplay by Dean Devlin and Roland Emmerich, story by Ted Elliot, Terry Rossio, Dean Devlin and Roland Emmerich, based on the Godzilla character created by Toho
 Spice World, written by Kim Fuller, idea by Fuller and the Spice Girls
1999 Wild Wild West, story by Jim Thomas & John Thomas, screenplay by S. S. Wilson, Brent Maddock, Jeffrey Price and Peter S. Seaman, based on the television series created by Michael Garrison
 Big Daddy, screenplay by Steve Franks and Tim Herlihy & Adam Sandler
 The Haunting, screenplay by David Self, based on the novel The Haunting of Hill House by Shirley Jackson
 The Mod Squad, screenplay by Stephen T. Kay & Scott Silver and Kate Lanier, based on the television series created by Bud Ruskin
 Star Wars: Episode I – The Phantom Menace, written by George Lucas

2000s
2000 Battlefield Earth, screenplay by Corey Mandell and J.D. Shapiro, based on the novel by L. Ron Hubbard
 Book of Shadows: Blair Witch 2, written by Dick Beebe and Joe Berlinger
 How the Grinch Stole Christmas, screenplay by Jeffrey Price and Peter S. Seaman, based on the book by Dr. Seuss
 Little Nicky, written by Tim Herlihy, Adam Sandler and Steven Brill
 The Next Best Thing, written by Tom Ropelewski
2001 Freddy Got Fingered, written by Tom Green & Derek Harvie
 Driven, written by Sylvester Stallone, Jan Skrentny and Neal Tabachnick
 Glitter, screenplay by Kate Lanier and Cheryl L. West
 Pearl Harbor, written by Randall Wallace
 3000 Miles to Graceland, written by Richard Recco and Demian Lichtenstein
2002 Star Wars: Episode II – Attack of the Clones, screenplay by George Lucas and Jonathan Hales
 The Adventures of Pluto Nash, written by Neil Cuthbert
 Crossroads, screenplay by Shonda Rhimes
 Pinocchio, screenplay by Vincenzo Cerami and Roberto Benigni, based on the book by Carlo Collodi
 Swept Away, screenplay by Guy Ritchie
2003 Gigli, written by Martin Brest
 The Cat in the Hat, screenplay by Alec Berg, David Mandel and Jeff Schaffer, based on the book by Dr. Seuss
 Charlie's Angels: Full Throttle, screenplay by John August and Marianne Wibberley & Cormac Wibberley
 Dumb and Dumberer: When Harry Met Lloyd, screenplay by Robert Brener and Troy Miller, based on characters created by Peter Farrelly, Bennett Yellin and Bobby Farrelly
 From Justin to Kelly, written by Kim Fuller
2004 Catwoman, written by Theresa Rebeck and John Brancato & Michael Ferris and John Rogers
 Alexander, written by Oliver Stone and Christopher Kyle and Laeta Kalogridis
 Superbabies: Baby Geniuses 2, story by Steven Paul, screenplay by Gregory Poppen
 Surviving Christmas, written by Deborah Kaplan & Harry Elfont and Jeffrey Ventimilia & Joshua Sternin
 White Chicks, written by Keenen Ivory & Shawn & Marlon Wayans and Andy McElfresh, Michael Anthony Snowden and Xavier Cook
2005 Dirty Love, written by Jenny McCarthy
 Bewitched, screenplay by Nora Ephron, Delia Ephron and Adam McKay, based on the television series created by Sol Saks
 Deuce Bigalow: European Gigolo, written by Rob Schneider, David Garrett and Jason Ward
 The Dukes of Hazzard, screenplay by John O'Brien, based on the television series created by Gy Waldron
 Son of the Mask, written by Lance Khazei
2006 Basic Instinct 2, screenplay by Leora Barish and Henry Bean, based on characters created by Joe Eszterhas
 BloodRayne, screenplay by Guinevere Turner, based on the video game
 Lady in the Water, written by M. Night Shyamalan
 Little Man, written by Keenen Ivory Wayans, Marlon Wayans and Shawn Wayans
 The Wicker Man, screenplay adapted by Neil LaBute from an earlier screenplay by Anthony Shaffer
2007 I Know Who Killed Me, written by Jeffrey Hammond
 Daddy Day Camp, screenplay by Geoff Rodkey, David J. Stem & David N. Weiss
 Epic Movie, written by Jason Friedberg & Aaron Seltzer
 I Now Pronounce You Chuck and Larry, screenplay by Barry Fanaro, Alexander Payne & Jim Taylor
 Norbit, screenplay by Eddie Murphy & Charlie Murphy and Jay Sherick & David Ronn
2008 The Love Guru, written by Mike Myers & Graham Gordy
 Disaster Movie and Meet the Spartans (jointly), written by Jason Friedberg & Aaron Seltzer
 The Happening, written by M. Night Shyamalan
 The Hottie & the Nottie, written by Heidi Ferrer
 In the Name of the King, screenplay by Doug Taylor
2009 Transformers: Revenge of the Fallen, screenplay by Ehren Kruger, Alex Kurtzman and Roberto Orci, based on Hasbro's Transformers toys
 All About Steve, written by Kim Barker
 G.I. Joe: The Rise of Cobra, screenplay by Stuart Beattie, David Elliot and Paul Lovett, based on Hasbro's G.I. Joe characters
 Land of the Lost, screenplay by Chris Henchy and Dennis McNicholas, based on the television series created by Sid and Marty Krofft
 The Twilight Saga: New Moon, screenplay by Melissa Rosenberg, based on the novel by Stephenie Meyer

2010s
2010 The Last Airbender - screenplay by M. Night Shyamalan, based on the television series created by Michael Dante DiMartino and Bryan Konietzko
Little Fockers - screenplay by John Hamburg and Larry Stuckey, based on characters created by Greg Glienna and Mary Ruth Clarke
Sex and the City 2 - screenplay by Michael Patrick King, based on the television series created by Darren Star
The Twilight Saga: Eclipse - screenplay by Melissa Rosenberg, based on the novel by Stephenie Meyer
Vampires Suck - written by Jason Friedberg and Aaron Seltzer
2011 Jack and Jill - screenplay by Steve Koren and Adam Sandler, story by Ben Zook
Bucky Larson: Born to Be a Star - written by Adam Sandler, Allen Covert and Nick Swardson
New Year's Eve - written by Katherine Fugate
Transformers: Dark of the Moon - screenplay by Ehren Kruger, based on Hasbro's "Transformers" toys
The Twilight Saga: Breaking Dawn – Part 1 - screenplay by Melissa Rosenberg, based on the novel by Stephenie Meyer
 2012 That's My Boy - written by David Caspe
Atlas Shrugged: Part II - screenplay by Duke Sandefur, Brian Patrick O'Toole and Duncan Scott, based on the novel by Ayn Rand
Battleship - screenplay by Jon and Erich Hoeber, based on the boardgame by Hasbro
A Thousand Words - written by Steve Koren
The Twilight Saga: Breaking Dawn – Part 2 - screenplay by Melissa Rosenberg and Stephenie Meyer, based on the novel by Meyer
 2013 Movie 43 - written by countless screenwriters
After Earth - screenplay by M. Night Shyamalan and Gary Whitta, story by Will Smith
Grown Ups 2 - screenplay by Adam Sandler, Tim Herlihy and Fred Wolf
The Lone Ranger - screenplay by Justin Haythe, Ted Elliott and Terry Rossio, story by Ted Elliott, Terry Rossio and Justin Haythe, based on Lone Ranger by Fran Striker and George W. Trendle
A Madea Christmas - written by Tyler Perry
 2014 Saving Christmas - written by Darren Doane and Cheston Hervey 
Left Behind - screenplay by Paul LaLonde and John Patus, based on the novel by Tim LaHaye and Jerry B. Jenkins
Sex Tape - screenplay by Kate Angelo, Jason Segel and Nicholas Stoller, story by Kate Angelo
Teenage Mutant Ninja Turtles - screenplay by Evan Daugherty, Andre Nemec and Josh Appelbaum, based on characters created by Peter Laird and Kevin Eastman
Transformers: Age of Extinction - screenplay by Ehren Kruger, based on Hasbro's "Transformers" toys
 2015 Fifty Shades of Grey - screenplay by Kelly Marcel, based on the novel by E. L. James
Fantastic Four - screenplay by Jeremy Slater, Simon Kinberg and Josh Trank, based on the Marvel Comics characters created by Stan Lee and Jack Kirby
Jupiter Ascending - written by The Wachowskis
Paul Blart: Mall Cop 2 - written by Nick Bakay and Kevin James
Pixels - screenplay by Tim Herlihy and Timothy Dowling, story by Tim Herlihy, based on the short film by Patrick Jean
 2016 Batman v Superman: Dawn of Justice - screenplay by Chris Terrio and David S. Goyer, based on characters created by DC Comics
Dirty Grandpa - written by John M. Phillips
Gods of Egypt - written by Matt Sazama and Burk Sharpless
Hillary's America: The Secret History of the Democratic Party - written by Dinesh D'Souza and Bruce Schooley
Independence Day: Resurgence - screenplay by Nicolas Wright, James A. Woods, Dean Devlin, Roland Emmerich and James Vanderbilt, story by Dean Devlin, Roland Emmerich, Nicolas Wright and James A. Woods
Suicide Squad - screenplay by David Ayer, based on characters created by DC Comics
 2017 The Emoji Movie - screenplay by Tony Leondis, Eric Siegel and Mike White, story by Tony Leondis and Eric Siegel
Baywatch - screenplay by Mark Swift and Damian Shannon, story by Jay Scherick, David Ronn, Thomas Lennon and Robert Ben Garant, based on the television series created by Michael Berk, Douglas Schwartz and Gregory J. Bonann
Fifty Shades Darker - screenplay by Niall Leonard, based on the novel by E. L. James
The Mummy - screenplay by David Koepp, Christopher McQuarrie and Dylan Kussman, story by Jon Spaihts, Alex Kurtzman and Jenny Lumet, based on The Mummy franchise
Transformers: The Last Knight - screenplay by Art Marcum, Matt Holloway and Ken Nolan, story by Akiva Goldsman, Art Marcum, Matt Holloway and Ken Nolan, based on Hasbro's "Transformers" toys
 2018 Fifty Shades Freed - screenplay by Niall Leonard, based on the novel by E. L. James
Death of a Nation - screenplay by Dinesh D'Souza and Bruce Schooley, based on The Big Lie and Death of a Nation by Dinesh D'Souza
Gotti - written by Lem Dobbs and Leo Rossi
The Happytime Murders - screenplay by Todd Berger, story by Todd Berger and Dee Austin Robertson
Winchester - screenplay by Tom Vaughan and The Spierig Brothers
2019 Cats – screenplay by Lee Hall and Tom Hooper; based on the musical by Andrew Lloyd Webber, which was based on Old Possum's Book of Practical Cats by T. S. Eliot
The Haunting of Sharon Tate – written by Daniel Farrands
Hellboy – screenplay by Andrew Cosby; based on the Dark Horse Comics character by Mike Mignola
A Madea Family Funeral – written by Tyler Perry
Rambo: Last Blood – screenplay by Matthew Cirulnick and Sylvester Stallone; based on the character created by David Morrell

2020s
2020 - 365 Days - screenplay by Tomasz Klimala, Barbara Bialowas, Tomasz Mandes and Blanka Lipinska; based on the novel by Blanka Lipinska
Corona Zombies, Barbie & Kendra Save the Tiger King and Barbie & Kendra Storm Area 51 - written by Kent Roudebush, Silvia St. Croix and Billy Butler
Dolittle - screenplay by Stephen Gaghan, Dan Gregor and Doug Mand, story by Thomas Shepherd; based on a series of books by Hugh Lofting
Fantasy Island - screenplay by Jeff Wadlow, Chris Roach and Jillian Jacobs; based on the television series created by Gene Levitt
Hillbilly Elegy - screenplay by Vanessa Taylor, based on the book by J. D. Vance
2021 - Diana the Musical – screenplay by Joe DiPietro; music and lyrics by David Bryan and DiPietro
Karen – written by "Coke" Daniels
The Misfits – screenplay by Robert Henny and Kurt Wimmer; screen story by Robert Henny
Twist – written by Sally Collett and John Wrathall; additional material by Tom Grass, Kevin Lehane, Michael Lindley, and Matthew Parkhill (from an "Original Idea" by David T. Lynch, Keith Lynch, and Simon Thomas)
The Woman in the Window – screenplay by Tracy Letts, based on the novel by A. J. Finn
2022 - Blonde – screenplay by Andrew Dominik; based on the novel by Joyce Carol OatesGood Mourning – written by Machine Gun Kelly and Mod SunJurassic World Dominion – screenplay by Emily Carmichael and Colin Trevorrow; story by Colin Trevorrow and Derek ConnollyMorbius – screen story and screenplay by Matt Sazama and Burk SharplessPinocchio – screenplay by Robert Zemeckis and Chris Weitz; based on the 1940 Disney animated film and the novel The Adventures of Pinocchio'' by Carlo Collodi

References

Golden Raspberry Awards by category
Screenwriting awards for film